The Egon Ranshofen-Wertheimer Award was founded (and is awarded) by the city of Braunau am Inn in cooperation with the Society for Contemporary History.

Named after the journalist, political scientist and diplomat Egon Ranshofen-Wertheimer, the price honors Austrians living abroad for an outstanding commitment to their home country Austria.

On September 29, 2007, the first award ceremony took place in the course of the 16th Braunau Contemporary History Days. The laudator was the ambassador Emil Brix, head of the politico-cultural section of the Austrian Ministry for Foreign Affairs.

Winners 
 2007 Tizzy von Trapp was honored on behalf of the charity organization Trapp Family Austrian Relief Inc.
 2008 Ernst Florian Winter as the founding rector of the Diplomatic Academy of Vienna
 2010 Dietmar Schönherr
 2013 Günther Greindl
 2015 Manfred Nowak

References

External links 
 Braunau Contemporary History Days
 Egon Ranshofen-Wertheimer Award
 Website of the Society for Contemporary History 

Austrian awards
Braunau am Inn